Marie Branser (born 15 August 1992 in Leipzig) is a German-born naturalized Guinean judoka, who formerly also represented the Democratic Republic of the Congo at the Olympics. She is a two-time African Judo Championships gold medalist. In 2021, she competed in the women's 78 kg event at the 2020 Summer Olympics in Tokyo, Japan.

Career

Germany
Branser won one silver and three bronze medals at the German National Judo Championships, but she never represented Germany on the senior major international tournament.

DR Congo
In 2019, she changed her nationality to Congolese to try to qualify for the 2020 Summer Olympic Games. She still lives and trains in Leipzig but represents Democratic Republic of the Congo in international competitions.

In 2020, she won the gold medal in the women's 78 kg event at the 2020 African Judo Championships held in Antananarivo, Madagascar.

In May 2021, she retained her championship title after winning the women's 78 kg event at the 2021 African Judo Championships held in Dakar, Senegal.

Guinea
In 2022, Branser decided to change nationality to Guinea, citing inactivity and negligence of the Congolese Judo Federation since the Olympics. Following the switch, she went on to win the 2022 African Open at Dakar in her first outing for Guinea.

Achievements

References

External links 
 

Living people
1992 births
Sportspeople from Leipzig
German female judoka
Democratic Republic of the Congo female judoka
Guinean female judoka
Judoka at the 2020 Summer Olympics
Olympic judoka of the Democratic Republic of the Congo
Democratic Republic of the Congo people of German descent
Guinean people of German descent
Naturalized citizens of Democratic Republic of the Congo
Naturalized citizens of Guinea